Nashornet Mountain is a mountain 6 nautical miles (11 km) northeast of Viddalskollen Hill, on the south side of Viddalen Valley in Queen Maud Land. Mapped by Norwegian cartographers from surveys and air photos by Norwegian-British-Swedish Antarctic Expedition (NBSAE) (1949–52) and air photos by the Norwegian expedition (1958–59) and named Nashornet (the rhinoceros).

Mountains of Queen Maud Land
Princess Martha Coast